Los Angeles v. Patel, 576 U.S. 409 (2015), was a United States Supreme Court case in which the Court held that a Los Angeles law, Municipal Code § 41.49, requiring hotel operators to retain records about guests for a ninety-day period is facially unconstitutional under the Fourth Amendment to the United States Constitution because it does not allow for pre-compliance review.

Background 
Los Angeles, in its city code, required hotels to keep certain specified information about their customers, including the name and address, vehicle information, dates of the stay, room number, and how the customer paid the bill, among other information. The hotel had to keep the information for 90-days, and if a police officer requested the information, the hotel had to make it available or face criminal penalties. In 2003, Naranjibhai and Ramilaben Patel and other hotel operators sued the city in the federal district court, alleging that the ordinance violated the Fourth Amendment.

Lower courts

U.S. District Court
The case was first heard in the U.S. District Court by Judge Dale S. Fischer. The city argued that the hotel industry was "closely regulated," which would allow administrative inspections without a search warrant. Judge Fischer found that the industry was not closely regulated, noting that the city had provided no information to show that it was closely regulated. She concluded, however, that the hotel owners had no reasonable expectation of privacy and that the ordinance was therefore constitutional.

Circuit court of appeals
Patel appealed to the Ninth Circuit court, where it was heard by a three judge panel consisting of judges Harry Pregerson, Richard R. Clifton, and Carlos Bea. The court, in a 2-1 decision, affirmed the decision of the district court on the same grounds.

En banc rehearing
The Patels then requested that the case be reheard en banc, before a larger panel of judges in the Ninth Circuit. The en banc court found that the owners did, in fact, have a possessory interest in the registry and an expectation of privacy. The fact that this was hotel property and there was a reasonable expectation of privacy placed the documents under the warrant requirement of the Fourth Amendment. The court reversed on a 7-4 vote.

After the ruling, the City of Los Angeles filed a petition for certiorari to the Supreme Court, which the Court granted on October 20, 2014.

Supreme Court

Arguments

Brief and arguments of Los Angeles
The city's brief was prepared by E. Joshua Rosenkranz, Robert M. Loeb, and Rachel W. Apter, of Orrick, Herrington & Sutcliffe; by Orin Kerr; and by Mike Feuer, James P. Clark, Thomas H. Peters, Gregory P. Orland of the City Attorney's Office. Rosenkranz argued that the ordinance had been in effect and used for 150 years and only required showing the police a single book. Further, that the use of the register serves as a deterrent to crime.

Brief and arguments of Patel
Patel's brief was prepared by Thomas C. Goldstein, Kevin K. Russell, and Tejinder Singh, of Goldstein & Russell; and by the Supreme Court Litigation Clinic, Harvard Law School.

Amicus briefs
Amicus curiae briefs in support of Los Angeles were filed by the United States, the County of Los Angeles, by California, Drug Free America Foundation, California State Sheriffs' Association, and the Manhattan Institute for Policy Research. Briefs in support of Patel were filed by the Asian American Hotel Owners Association, the Electronic Frontier Foundation, the U.S. Chamber of Commerce, the Rutherford Institute, Gun Owners of America, the Cato Institute, Professors Adam Lamparello & Charles E. MacLean, Institute for Justice, Google, and the Electronic Privacy Information Center. A brief in support of neither party was filed by Love146.

Opinion of the Court 
Associate Justice Sonia Sotomayor authored the 5–4 majority opinion, joined by Justices Kennedy, Ginsburg, Breyer, and Kagan. The majority opinion held that "facial challenges under the Fourth Amendment are not categorically barred or especially disfavored," citing cases such as Sibron v. New York and Chandler v. Miller.

Justice Antonin Scalia, joined by Roberts and Thomas, wrote a dissent to argue that such a warrantless search is permitted in this case because it satisfies the conditions of a regulatory scheme for a closely regulated business. Justice Samuel Alito, joined by Thomas, filed a second dissent, listing five other scenarios where the law could be applied constitutionally.

See also
 List of United States Supreme Court cases, volume 576

Notes

References

External links
 

United States Supreme Court cases
United States Supreme Court cases of the Roberts Court
United States Fourth Amendment case law
2015 in United States case law
Hotels in Los Angeles